Halley's Comet, Comet Halley, or sometimes simply Halley, officially designated 1P/Halley, is a short-period comet visible from Earth every 75–79 years. Halley is the only known short-period comet that is regularly visible to the naked eye from Earth, and thus the only naked-eye comet that can appear twice in a human lifetime.  It last appeared in the inner parts of the Solar System in 1986 and will next appear in mid-2061.

Halley's periodic returns to the inner Solar System have been observed and recorded by astronomers around the world since at least 240 BC. But it was not until 1705 that the English astronomer Edmond Halley understood that these appearances were re-appearances of the same comet. As a result of this discovery, the comet is named after Edmond Halley.

During its 1986 visit to the inner Solar System, Halley's Comet became the first comet to be observed in detail by spacecraft, providing the first observational data on the structure of a comet nucleus and the mechanism of coma and tail formation. These observations supported a number of longstanding hypotheses about comet construction, particularly Fred Whipple's "dirty snowball" model, which correctly predicted that Halley would be composed of a mixture of volatile ices—such as water, carbon dioxide, ammonia, and dust. The missions also provided data that substantially reformed and reconfigured these ideas; for instance, it is now understood that the surface of Halley is largely composed of dusty, non-volatile materials, and that only a small portion of it is icy.

Pronunciation
Colin Ronan, one of Edmond Halley's biographers, preferred , rhyming with crawly. Spellings of Halley's name during his lifetime included Hailey, Haley, Hayley, Halley, Hawley, and Hawly, so its contemporary pronunciation is uncertain, but the version rhyming with valley seems to be preferred by current bearers of the surname.

Computation of orbit

Halley was the first comet to be recognized as periodic. Until the Renaissance, the philosophical consensus on the nature of comets, promoted by Aristotle, was that they were disturbances in Earth's atmosphere. This idea was disproved in 1577 by Tycho Brahe, who used parallax measurements to show that comets must lie beyond the Moon. Many were still unconvinced that comets orbited the Sun, and assumed instead that they must follow straight paths through the Solar System.

In 1687, Sir Isaac Newton published his Philosophiæ Naturalis Principia Mathematica, in which he outlined his laws of gravity and motion. His work on comets was decidedly incomplete. Although he had suspected that two comets that had appeared in succession in 1680 and 1681 were the same comet before and after passing behind the Sun (he was later found to be correct; see Newton's Comet), he was unable to completely reconcile comets into his model.

Ultimately, it was Newton's friend, editor and publisher, Edmond Halley, who, in his 1705 Synopsis of the Astronomy of Comets, used Newton's new laws to calculate the gravitational effects of Jupiter and Saturn on cometary orbits. Having compiled a list of 24 comet observations, he calculated that the orbital elements of a second comet that had appeared in 1682 were nearly the same as those of two comets that had appeared in 1531 (observed by Petrus Apianus) and 1607 (observed by Johannes Kepler). Halley thus concluded that all three comets were, in fact, the same object returning about every 76 years, a period that has since been found to vary between 74 and 79 years. After a rough estimate of the perturbations the comet would sustain from the gravitational attraction of the planets, he predicted its return for 1758. While he had personally observed the comet around perihelion in September 1682, Halley died in 1742 before he could observe its predicted return.

Halley's prediction of the comet's return proved to be correct, although it was not seen until 25 December 1758, by Johann Georg Palitzsch, a German farmer and amateur astronomer. It did not pass through its perihelion until 13 March 1759, the attraction of Jupiter and Saturn having caused a retardation of 618 days. This effect was computed before its return (with a one-month error to 13 April) by a team of three French mathematicians, Alexis Clairaut, Joseph Lalande, and Nicole-Reine Lepaute. The confirmation of the comet's return was the first time anything other than planets had been shown to orbit the Sun. It was also one of the earliest successful tests of Newtonian physics, and a clear demonstration of its explanatory power. The comet was first named in Halley's honour by French astronomer Nicolas-Louis de Lacaille in 1759.

Some scholars have proposed that first-century Mesopotamian astronomers already had recognized Halley's Comet as periodic. This theory notes a passage in the Babylonian Talmud, tractate Horayot that refers to "a star which appears once in seventy years that makes the captains of the ships err."

Researchers in 1981 attempting to calculate the past orbits of Halley by numerical integration starting from accurate observations in the seventeenth and eighteenth centuries could not produce accurate results further back than 837 owing to a close approach to Earth in that year. It was necessary to use ancient Chinese comet observations to constrain their calculations.

Orbit and origin

Halley's orbital period has varied between 74 and 79 years since 240 BC. Its orbit around the Sun is highly elliptical, with an orbital eccentricity of 0.967 (with 0 being a circle and 1 being a parabolic trajectory). This is between the orbits of Mercury and Venus. Unusual for an object in the Solar System, Halley's orbit is retrograde; it orbits the Sun in the opposite direction to the planets, or, clockwise from above the Sun's north pole. The orbit is inclined by 18° to the ecliptic, with much of it lying south of the ecliptic. (Because it is retrograde, the true inclination is 162°.) Owing to the retrograde orbit, it has one of the highest velocities relative to the Earth of any object in the Solar System. Because its orbit comes close to Earth's in two places, Halley is associated with two meteor showers: the Eta Aquariids in early May, and the Orionids in late October. Halley is the parent body to the Orionids, while observations conducted around the time of Halley's appearance in 1986 suggested that the comet could additionally perturb the Eta Aquariids, although it might not be the parent of that shower.

Halley is classified as a periodic or short-period comet; one with an orbit lasting 200 years or less. This contrasts it with long-period comets, whose orbits last for thousands of years. Periodic comets have an average inclination to the ecliptic of only ten degrees, and an orbital period of just 6.5 years, so Halley's orbit is atypical. Most short-period comets (those with orbital periods shorter than 20 years and inclinations of 20–30 degrees or less) are called Jupiter-family comets. Those resembling Halley, with orbital periods of between 20 and 200 years and inclinations extending from zero to more than 90 degrees, are called Halley-type comets. , only 75 Halley-type comets have been observed, compared with 511 identified Jupiter-family comets.

The orbits of the Halley-type comets suggest that they were originally long-period comets whose orbits were perturbed by the gravity of the giant planets and directed into the inner Solar System. If Halley was once a long-period comet, it is likely to have originated in the Oort cloud, a sphere of cometary bodies around 20,000–50,000 au from the Sun. Conversely the Jupiter-family comets are generally believed to originate in the Kuiper belt, a flat disc of icy debris between 30 au (Neptune's orbit) and 50 au from the Sun (in the scattered disc). Another point of origin for the Halley-type comets was proposed in 2008, when a trans-Neptunian object with a retrograde orbit similar to Halley's was discovered, whose orbit takes it from just outside that of Uranus to twice the distance of Pluto. It may be a member of a new population of small Solar System bodies that serves as the source of Halley-type comets.

Halley has probably been in its current orbit for 16,000–200,000 years, although it is not possible to numerically integrate its orbit for more than a few tens of apparitions, and close approaches before 837 AD can only be verified from recorded observations. The non-gravitational effects can be crucial; as Halley approaches the Sun, it expels jets of sublimating gas from its surface, which knock it very slightly off its orbital path. These orbital changes cause delays in its perihelion of four days on average.

In 1989, Boris Chirikov and Vitold Vecheslavov performed an analysis of 46 apparitions of Halley's Comet taken from historical records and computer simulations. These studies showed that its dynamics were chaotic and unpredictable on long timescales. Halley's projected lifetime could be as long as 10 million years. These studies also showed that many physical properties of Halley's Comet dynamics can be approximately described by a simple symplectic map, known as the Kepler map. More recent work suggests that Halley will evaporate, or split in two, within the next few tens of thousands of years, or will be ejected from the Solar System within a few hundred thousand years. Observations by D. W. Hughes suggest that Halley's nucleus has been reduced in mass by 80 to 90% over the last 2,000 to 3,000 revolutions.

Structure and composition

The Giotto and Vega missions gave planetary scientists their first view of Halley's surface and structure. Like all comets, as Halley nears the Sun, its volatile compounds (those with low boiling points, such as water, carbon monoxide, carbon dioxide and other ices) begin to sublimate from the surface of its nucleus. Evaporation of this dirty ice releases dust particles, which travel with the gas away from the nucleus. Gas molecules in the coma absorb solar light and then re-radiate it at different wavelengths, a phenomenon known as fluorescence, whereas dust particles scatter the solar light. Both processes are responsible for making the coma visible. As a fraction of the gas molecules in the coma are ionized by the solar ultraviolet radiation, pressure from the solar wind, a stream of charged particles emitted by the Sun, pulls the coma's ions out into a long tail, which may extend more than 100 million kilometres into space. Changes in the flow of the solar wind can cause disconnection events, in which the tail completely breaks off from the nucleus.

Its shape vaguely resembles that of a peanut shell. Ground-based observations of coma brightness suggested that Halley's rotation period was about 7.4 days. Images taken by the various spacecraft, along with observations of the jets and shell, suggested a period of 52 hours. Given the irregular shape of the nucleus, Halley's rotation is likely to be complex. Although only 25% of Halley's surface was imaged in detail during the flyby missions, the images revealed an extremely varied topography, with hills, mountains, ridges, depressions, and at least one crater.

Halley is the most active of all the periodic comets, with others, such as Comet Encke and Comet Holmes, being one or two orders of magnitude less active. Its day side (the side facing the Sun) is far more active than the night side. Spacecraft observations showed that the gases ejected from the nucleus were 80% water vapour, 17% carbon monoxide and 3–4% carbon dioxide, with traces of hydrocarbons although more-recent sources give a value of 10% for carbon monoxide and also include traces of methane and ammonia. The dust particles were found to be primarily a mixture of carbon–hydrogen–oxygen–nitrogen (CHON) compounds common in the outer Solar System, and silicates, such as are found in terrestrial rocks. The dust particles decreased in size down to the limits of detection (≈0.001 µm). The ratio of deuterium to hydrogen in the water released by Halley was initially thought to be similar to that found in Earth's ocean water, suggesting that Halley-type comets may have delivered water to Earth in the distant past. Subsequent observations showed Halley's deuterium ratio to be far higher than that found in Earth's oceans, making such comets unlikely sources for Earth's water.

Giotto provided the first evidence in support of Fred Whipple's "dirty snowball" hypothesis for comet construction; Whipple postulated that comets are icy objects warmed by the Sun as they approach the inner Solar System, causing ices on their surfaces to sublimate (change directly from a solid to a gas), and jets of volatile material to burst outward, creating the coma. Giotto showed that this model was broadly correct, though with modifications. Halley's albedo, for instance, is about 4%, meaning that it reflects only 4% of the sunlight hitting it; about what one would expect for coal. Thus, despite appearing brilliant white to observers on Earth, Halley's Comet is in fact pitch black. This suggested that only 10% of Halley's surface was active, and that large portions of it were coated in a layer of dark dust that retained heat. Together, these observations suggested that Halley was in fact predominantly composed of non-volatile materials, and thus more closely resembled a "snowy dirtball" than a "dirty snowball".

History

Before 1066

Halley may have been recorded as early as 467 BC, but this is uncertain. A comet was recorded in ancient Greece between 468 and 466 BC; its timing, location, duration, and associated meteor shower all suggest it was Halley. According to Pliny the Elder, that same year a meteorite fell in the town of Aegospotami, in Thrace. He described it as brown in colour and the size of a wagon load. Chinese chroniclers also mention a comet in that year.

The first certain appearance of Halley's Comet in the historical record is a description from 240 BC, in the Chinese chronicle Records of the Grand Historian or Shiji, which describes a comet that appeared in the east and moved north. The only surviving record of the 164 BC apparition is found on two fragmentary Babylonian tablets, now owned by the British Museum.

The apparition of 87 BC was recorded in Babylonian tablets which state that the comet was seen "day beyond day" for a month. This appearance may be recalled in the representation of Tigranes the Great, an Armenian king who is depicted on coins with a crown that features, according to Vahe Gurzadyan and R. Vardanyan, "a star with a curved tail [that] may represent the passage of Halley's Comet in 87 BC." Gurzadyan and Vardanyan argue that "Tigranes could have seen Halley's Comet when it passed closest to the Sun on August 6 in 87 BC" as the comet would have been a "most recordable event"; for ancient Armenians it could have heralded the New Era of the brilliant King of Kings.

The apparition of 12 BC was recorded in the Book of Han by Chinese astronomers of the Han Dynasty who tracked it from August through October. It passed within 0.16 au of Earth. According to the Roman historian Cassius Dio, a comet appeared suspended over Rome for several days portending the death of Marcus Vipsanius Agrippa in that year. Halley's appearance in 12 BC, only a few years distant from the conventionally assigned date of the birth of Jesus Christ, has led some theologians and astronomers to suggest that it might explain the biblical story of the Star of Bethlehem. There are other explanations for the phenomenon, such as planetary conjunctions, and there are also records of other comets that appeared closer to the date of Jesus' birth.

If, as has been suggested, the reference by Yehoshua ben Hananiah in b. Horayot 10a to "a star which arises once in seventy years and misleads the sailors" refers to Halley's Comet, it may be a reference to the 66 AD appearance, because this apparition was the only one to occur during Yehoshua ben Hananiah's lifetime.

The 141 AD apparition was recorded in Chinese chronicles. It was also recorded in the Tamil work Purananuru, in connection with the death of the south Indian Chera king Yanaikatchai Mantaran Cheral Irumporai.

The 374 AD and 607 approaches each came within 0.09 au of Earth. The 451 AD apparition was said to herald the defeat of Attila the Hun at the Battle of Chalons. The 684 AD apparition was recorded in Europe in one of the sources used by the compiler of the 1493 Nuremberg Chronicles, which contains an image 8 centuries after the event. Chinese records also report it as the "broom star". In 837, Halley's Comet may have passed as close as 0.03 au (3.2 million miles; 5.1 million kilometres) from Earth, by far its closest approach. Its tail may have stretched 60 degrees across the sky. It was recorded by astronomers in China, Japan, Germany, the Byzantine Empire, and the Middle East; Emperor Louis the Pious observed this appearance and devoted himself to prayer and penance, fearing that "by this token a change in the realm and the death of a prince are made known." In 912, Halley is recorded in the Annals of Ulster, which state "A dark and rainy year. A comet appeared."

1066

In 1066, the comet was seen in England and thought to be an omen: later that year Harold II of England died at the Battle of Hastings and William the Conqueror claimed the throne. The comet is represented on the Bayeux Tapestry and described in the tituli as a star. Surviving accounts from the period describe it as appearing to be four times the size of Venus, and shining with a light equal to a quarter of that of the Moon. Halley came within 0.10 au of Earth at that time.

This appearance of the comet is also noted in the Anglo-Saxon Chronicle. Eilmer of Malmesbury may have seen Halley in 989 and 1066, as recorded by William of Malmesbury:"Not long after, a comet, portending (they say) a change in governments, appeared, trailing its long flaming hair through the empty sky: concerning which there was a fine saying of a monk of our monastery called Æthelmær. Crouching in terror at the sight of the gleaming star, ‘You've come, have you?’, he said. ‘You've come, you source of tears to many mothers. It is long since I saw you; but as I see you now you are much more terrible, for I see you brandishing the downfall of my country.’"

The Irish Annals of the Four Masters recorded the comet as "A star [that] appeared on the seventh of the Calends of May, on Tuesday after Little Easter, than whose light the brilliance or light of The Moon was not greater; and it was visible to all in this manner till the end of four nights afterwards." Chaco Native Americans in New Mexico may have recorded the 1066 apparition in their petroglyphs.

The Italo-Byzantine chronicle of Lupus the Protospatharios mentions that a "comet-star" appeared in the sky in the year 1067 (the chronicle is erroneous, as the event occurred in 1066, and by Robert he means William).

The Emperor Constantine Ducas died in the month of May, and his son Michael received the Empire. And in this year there appeared a comet star, and the Norman count Robert [sic] fought a battle with Harold, King of the English, and Robert was victorious and became king over the people of the English.

1145–1378

The 1145 apparition was recorded by the monk Eadwine. The 1986 apparition exhibited a fan tail similar to Eadwine's drawing. Some claim that Genghis Khan was inspired to turn his conquests toward Europe by the 1222 apparition. The 1301 apparition may have been seen by the artist Giotto di Bondone, who represented the Star of Bethlehem as a fire-colored comet in the Nativity section of his Arena Chapel cycle, completed in 1305. Its 1378 appearance is recorded in the Annales Mediolanenses as well as in East Asian sources.

1456

In 1456, the year of Halley's next apparition, the Ottoman Empire invaded the Kingdom of Hungary, culminating in the siege of Belgrade in July of that year. In a papal bull, Pope Callixtus III ordered special prayers be said for the city's protection. In 1470, the humanist scholar Bartolomeo Platina wrote in his Lives of the Popes that,

A hairy and fiery star having then made its appearance for several days, the mathematicians declared that there would follow grievous pestilence, dearth and some great calamity. Calixtus, to avert the wrath of God, ordered supplications that if evils were impending for the human race He would turn all upon the Turks, the enemies of the Christian name. He likewise ordered, to move God by continual entreaty, that notice should be given by the bells to call the faithful at midday to aid by their prayers those engaged in battle with the Turk.

Platina's account is not mentioned in official records. In the 18th century, a Frenchman further embellished the story, in anger at the Church, by claiming that the Pope had "excommunicated" the comet, though this story was most likely his own invention.

Halley's apparition of 1456 was also witnessed in Kashmir and depicted in great detail by Śrīvara, a Sanskrit poet and biographer to the Sultans of Kashmir. He read the apparition as a cometary portent of doom foreshadowing the imminent fall of Sultan Zayn al-Abidin (AD 1418/1420–1470).

After witnessing a bright light in the sky which most historians have identified as Halley's Comet, Zara Yaqob, Emperor of Ethiopia from 1434 to 1468, founded the city of Debre Berhan (tr. City of Light) and made it his capital for the remainder of his reign.

1531
In the Sikh scriptures of the Guru Granth Sahib, the founder of the faith Guru Nanak makes reference to "a long star that has risen" at Ang 1110, and it is believed by some Sikh scholars to be a reference to Halley's appearance in 1531.

1531–1759

Halley's periodic returns have been subject to scientific investigation since the 16th century. The three apparitions from 1531 to 1682 were noted by Edmond Halley, enabling him to predict it would return. One key breakthrough occurred when Halley talked with Newton about his ideas of the laws of motion. Newton also helped Halley get Flamsteed's data on the 1682 apparition. By studying data on the 1531, 1607, and 1682 comets, he came to the conclusion these were the same comet, and presented his findings in 1696.

One difficulty was accounting for variations in the comet's orbital period, which was over a year longer between 1531 and 1607 than it was between 1607 and 1682. Newton had theorized that such delays were caused by the gravity of other comets, but Halley found that Jupiter and Saturn would cause the appropriate delays. In the decades that followed, more refined mathematics would be worked on, notable by Paris Observatory; the work on Halley also provided a boost to Newton and Kepler's rules for celestial motions. (See also #Computation of orbit)

1835

The comet was also sketched by F.W. Bessel. Streams of vapour observed during the comet's 1835 apparition prompted astronomer Friedrich Wilhelm Bessel to propose that the jet forces of evaporating material could be great enough to significantly alter a comet's orbit.

An interview in 1910, of someone who was a teenager at the time of the 1835 apparition had this to say:

They go on to describe the comet's tail as being more broad and not as long as the comet of 1843 they had also witnessed.

Famous astronomers across the world made observations starting August 1835, including Struve at Dorpat observatory, and Sir John Herschel, who made of observations from the Cape of Good Hope. In the United States telescopic observations were made from Yale College. The new observations helped confirm early appearances of this comet including its 1456 and 1378 apparitions.

At Yale College in Connecticut, the comet was first reported on 31 August 1835 by astronomers D. Olmstead and E. Loomis. In Canada reports were made from Newfoundland and also Quebec. Reports came in from all over by later 1835, and often reported in newspapers of this time in Canada.

Several accounts of the 1835 apparition were made by observers who survived until the 1910 return, where increased interest in the comet led to their being interviewed.

Astrophotography was not known to have been attempted until 1839, as photography was still being invented in the 1830s, too late to photograph the apparition of 1P/Halley in 1835.

The time to Halley's return in 1910 would be only 74.42 years, one of the shortest known periods of its return, which is calculated to be as long as 79 years owing to the effects of the planets.

At Paris Observatory Halley's Comet 1835 apparition was observed with a Lerebours telescope of 24.4 cm (9.6 in) aperture by the astronomer François Arago. Arago recorded polimetric observations of Halley, and suggested that the tail might be sunlight reflecting off a sparsely distributed material; he had earlier made similar observations of Comet Tralles of 1819.

1910

The 1910 approach, which came into naked-eye view around 10 April and came to perihelion on 20 April, was notable for several reasons: it was the first approach of which photographs exist, and the first for which spectroscopic data were obtained. Furthermore, the comet made a relatively close approach of 0.15 au, making it a spectacular sight. Indeed, on 19 May, Earth actually passed through the tail of the comet. One of the substances discovered in the tail by spectroscopic analysis was the toxic gas cyanogen, which led astronomer Camille Flammarion to claim that, when Earth passed through the tail, the gas "would impregnate the atmosphere and possibly snuff out all life on the planet." His pronouncement led to panicked buying of gas masks and quack "anti-comet pills" and "anti-comet umbrellas" by the public. In reality, as other astronomers were quick to point out, the gas is so diffused that the world suffered no ill effects from the passage through the tail.

The comet added to the unrest in China on the eve of the Xinhai Revolution that would end the last dynasty in 1911. As James Hutson, a missionary in Sichuan Province at the time, recorded,

The people believe that it indicates calamity such as war, fire, pestilence, and a change of dynasty. In some places on certain days the doors were unopened for half a day, no water was carried and many did not even drink water as it was rumoured that pestilential vapour was being poured down upon the earth from the comet."

The 1910 visitation is also recorded as being the travelling companion of Hedley Churchward, the first known English Muslim to make the Haj pilgrimage to Mecca. However, his explanation of its scientific predictability did not meet with favour in the Holy City.

The comet was used in an advertising campaign of Le Bon Marché, a well-known department store in Paris.

The comet was also fertile ground for hoaxes. One that reached major newspapers claimed that the Sacred Followers, a supposed Oklahoma religious group, attempted to sacrifice a virgin to ward off the impending disaster, but were stopped by the police.

American satirist and writer Mark Twain was born on 30 November 1835, exactly two weeks after the comet's perihelion. In his autobiography, published in 1909, he said,

I came in with Halley's comet in 1835. It is coming again next year, and I expect to go out with it. It will be the greatest disappointment of my life if I don't go out with Halley's comet. The Almighty has said, no doubt: 'Now here are these two unaccountable freaks; they came in together, they must go out together.'

Twain died on 21 April 1910, the day following the comet's subsequent perihelion. The 1985 fantasy film The Adventures of Mark Twain was inspired by the quotation.

Halley's 1910 apparition is distinct from the Great Daylight Comet of 1910, which surpassed Halley in brilliance and was actually visible in broad daylight for a short period, approximately four months before Halley made its appearance.

1986

The 1986 apparition of Halley's Comet was the least favourable on record. In February 1986, the comet and the Earth were on opposite sides of the Sun, creating the worst possible viewing circumstances for Earth observers during the previous 2,000 years. Halley's closest approach was 0.42 au. Additionally, increased light pollution from urbanization caused many people to fail in attempts to see the comet. With the help of binoculars, observation  from areas outside cities was more successful. Further, the comet appeared brightest when it was almost invisible from the northern hemisphere in March and April 1986, with best opportunities occurring when the comet could be sighted close to the horizon at dawn and dusk, if not obscured by clouds.

The approach of the comet was first detected by astronomers David C. Jewitt and G. Edward Danielson on 16 October 1982 using the 5.1 m Hale telescope at Mount Palomar and a CCD camera.

The first visual observance of the comet on its 1986 return was by an amateur astronomer, Stephen James O'Meara, on 24 January 1985. O'Meara used a home-built  telescope on top of Mauna Kea to detect the magnitude 19.6 comet. The first to observe Halley's Comet with the naked eye during its 1986 apparition were Stephen Edberg (then serving as the coordinator for amateur observations at the NASA Jet Propulsion Laboratory) and Charles Morris on 8 November 1985.

Although the comet's retrograde orbit and high inclination made it difficult to send a space probe to it, the 1986 apparition gave scientists the opportunity to study the comet closely and several probes were launched to do so. The Soviet Vega 1 probe began returning images of Halley on 4 March 1986, captured the first-ever image of its nucleus, and made its flyby on 6 March. It was followed by the Vega 2 probe, making its flyby on 9 March. On 14 March, the Giotto space probe, launched by the European Space Agency, made the closest pass of the comet's nucleus. There also were two Japanese probes, Suisei and Sakigake. Unofficially, the numerous probes became known as the Halley Armada.

Based on data retrieved by the largest ultraviolet space telescope of the time, Astron, during its Halley's Comet observations in December 1985, a group of Soviet scientists developed a model of the comet's coma. The comet also was observed from space by the International Cometary Explorer (ICE). Originally named International Sun-Earth Explorer 3, the probe was renamed and freed from its  Lagrangian point location in Earth's orbit in order to intercept comets 21P/Giacobini-Zinner and Halley. ICE flew about 40.2 million km (25 million mi) from Halley's Comet on 28 March 1986.

Two Space Shuttle missions—the STS-51-L and the STS-61-E—had been scheduled to observe Halley's Comet from low Earth orbit. The STS-51-L mission carried the Shuttle-Pointed Tool for Astronomy (SPARTAN-203) satellite, also called the Halley's Comet Experiment Deployable (HCED). The ill-fated mission was ended by the Challenger disaster. Scheduled for March 1986, STS-61-E was a Columbia mission carrying the ASTRO-1 platform to study the comet. Owing to the suspension of the American human spaceflight program after the Challenger explosion, the mission was canceled and ASTRO-1 would not fly until late 1990 on STS-35.

After 1986

The outburst likely started in December 1990, and then the comet brightened from magnitude 24.3 to magnitude 18.9. Halley was most recently observed in 2003 by three of the Very Large Telescopes at Paranal, Chile, when Halley's magnitude was 28.2. The telescopes observed Halley, at the faintest and farthest any comet has ever been imaged, in order to verify a method for finding very faint trans-Neptunian objects. Astronomers are now able to observe the comet at any point in its orbit.

2061

The next perihelion of Halley's Comet is 28 July 2061, when it will be better positioned for observation than during the 1985–1986 apparition, as it will be on the same side of the Sun as Earth. The closest approach to Earth will be one day after perihelion. It is expected to have an apparent magnitude of −0.3, compared with only +2.1 for the 1986 apparition. On 9 September 2060, Halley will pass within  of Jupiter, and then on 20 August 2061 will pass within  of Venus.

2134
Halley will come to perihelion on 27 March 2134. Then on 7 May 2134, Halley will pass within  of Earth. Its apparent magnitude is expected to be −2.0.

Apparitions
Halley's calculations enabled the comet's earlier appearances to be found in the historical record. The following table sets out the astronomical designations for every apparition of Halley's Comet from 240 BC, the earliest documented widespread sighting. For example, "1P/1982 U1, 1986 III, 1982i" indicates that for the perihelion in 1986, Halley was the first period comet known (designated 1P) and this apparition was the first seen in half-month U (the second half of October) in 1982 (giving 1P/1982 U1); it was the third comet past perihelion in 1986 (1986 III); and it was the ninth comet spotted in 1982 (provisional designation 1982i). The perihelion dates of each apparition are shown. The perihelion dates farther from the present are approximate, mainly because of uncertainties in the modelling of non-gravitational effects. Perihelion dates of 1531 and earlier are in the Julian calendar, while perihelion dates 1607 and after are in the Gregorian calendar.

Halley's Comet is visible from Earth every 74–79 years.

See also
 List of Halley-type comets
 Halley's Comet in fiction
 Kepler orbit

References

Bibliography

External links

 Synopsis of the Astronomy of Comets (1706 reprint of Halley's 1705 paper)
 Halley's nucleus by Giotto spacecraft (ESA link)
 Image of Halley in 1986 by Giotto spacecraft (NASA link)
 cometography.com
 1P/Halley at CometBase database
 seds.org
 Orbital simulation from JPL (Java) / Ephemeris
  Donald Keith Yeomans, "Great Comets in History"
 A brief history of Halley's Comet (Ian Ridpath)
 Photographs of 1910 approach taken from the Lick Observatory from the Lick Observatory Records Digital Archive, UC Santa Cruz Library's Digital Collections 

 
Astronomical objects known since antiquity
Comets visited by spacecraft
Halley-type comets
Meteor shower progenitors
001P
0001
Periodic comets
Star of Bethlehem